Jack Connally (22 February 1927 – 6 February 2013) was an  Australian rules footballer who played with St Kilda in the Victorian Football League (VFL).

Notes

External links 

1927 births
2013 deaths
Australian rules footballers from Victoria (Australia)
St Kilda Football Club players